Steve McManus is a Republican who represented the 10th district in the Tennessee House of Representatives, encompassing Cordova and part of Shelby County, from 2006 to 2016.

Biography
Steve McManus was born on October 16, 1951. He received a Bachelor of Arts from the College of the Holy Cross in Worcester, Massachusetts.

He works as an investment adviser, and as a regional business commentator on Fox News. He is a past president of the Cordova Leadership Council. He is also a member of the Commerce, Insurance and Economic Development Task Force of the American Legislative Exchange Council (ALEC).

He is married with two children. He is a Roman Catholic.

References

Living people
1951 births
Republican Party members of the Tennessee House of Representatives
21st-century American politicians
People from Cordova, Tennessee